WVVW-LP was a Progressive Southern Gospel formatted broadcast radio station licensed to Belpre, Ohio, serving Parkersburg, West Virginia. WVVW-LP was owned and operated by Fellowship Baptist Church and Ministries.

The licensee surrendered WVVW-LP's license to the Federal Communications Commission (FCC) on July 27, 2017, who cancelled it the same day.

Rebroadcasters
WVVW-LP's programming was rebroadcast across two nearby low-power radio stations to widen its broadcast area. The licensee for WMBP-LP was The Mineral Wells Educational Association, while the licensee for WVVP-LP is Marietta-Williamstown Educational Association. WMBP-LP signed on for the first time on July 24, 2015, but surrendered its license to the FCC for cancellation on July 21, 2017. WVVP-LP's license was cancelled by the FCC on October 2, 2020, due to the station having been silent since December 24, 2016.

References

External links
 Praise FM Online
 

2002 establishments in Ohio
Southern Gospel radio stations in the United States
Radio stations established in 2002
VVW-LP
VVW-LP
Defunct radio stations in the United States
Radio stations disestablished in 2017
2017 disestablishments in Ohio
Defunct religious radio stations in the United States
VVW-LP